The Ngagyur Nyingma Institute (Tib: ,) of Namdroling Monastery was established by Penor Rinpoche in 1978.

General Information
Students from various countries go to Ngagyur Nyingma Institute for higher Buddhist studies. For nine years, they mainly study the Sutra and Tantra teachings of the Buddha, as well as the commentaries written by great Indian and Tibetan scholars. As an ancillary subjects, they study Buddhist philosophy in general, poetry, composition, grammar and the history of Tibet, as well as English and other languages. During the nine-year course, students complete four years for a   tha-bral smra-ba'i dbang-phyug degree (equivalent to a Higher Secondary degree), two more years for a   phar-phyin rab-'byams degree (equivalent to a bachelor's degree) and the last three years for a   mdo-rgyud nges-don btan-pa'i nyin-byed chen-po degree (equivalent to a master's degree). After the completion of the nine-year course, earning these three degrees, they are then placed in various monasteries and Dharma centres in Himalayan countries and abroad to render their service of teaching Buddhism. Ngagyur Nyingma Institute also provides an option to continue one’s study and research towards a PhD.

Branches
 Ngagyur Nyingma Research Center

Related academy
 Namdrol Ling Jr. High School (Yeshe Wodsal Sherab Raldri Ling)
 Ngagyur Nyingma Nunnery Institute

Related editorial committee
 Ngagyur Rigzod Editorial Committee
 Rigzod Computer Section
 Padma Mani Translation Committee
 Tshogyal Editorial Committee
 International Nyingma Dictionary Editorial Committee
 Palyul Dictionary Editorial Committee

References

Further reading
 Zangpo, Tsering Lama Jampal (1988), A Garland of Immortal Wish-Fulfilling Trees, Ithaca, NY: Snow Lion Publications. , 
 Nyoshul Khen Rinpoche (2005), "A Marvelous Garland of Rare Gems: Biographies of Masters of Awareness in the Dzogchen Lineage", Junction City, CA: Padma Publishing.  
 
 Ngagyur Nyingma Institute

External links
 

Buddhist schools